Jerry Wayne Parrish (March 10, 1944August 25, 1998), also known by his Korean name Kim Yu-il, was a United States Army corporal who was one of six American soldiers to defect to North Korea, four of them during the 1960s, in the years after the Korean War.

Parrish was born in Morganfield, Kentucky and was shipped to South Korea as a corporal in the U.S Army. American soldiers Larry Allen Abshier and Joe Dresnok had separately defected, during 1962, when they crossed the Demilitarized Zone (DMZ).  Parrish crossed in 1963.

Sergeant Charles Robert Jenkins, who in 1965 became the fourth to cross the border, wrote in his autobiography that Parrish's reasons for defecting were "personal, and [Parrish] didn't elaborate about them much except to say that if he ever went home, his father-in-law would kill him." Dresnok stated in his documentary that Parrish had received death threats from his stepfather who had accused him of having sexual relations with his stepsister.

Along with the three other defectors, Parrish was eventually granted citizenship. He married a Lebanese woman, Siham Shraiteh, and together they had three sons (two of them named Michael and Ricky), all of whom remain in North Korea. Jenkins, in his autobiography, claims that Siham and three other Lebanese young women were lured to North Korea under false pretenses, then married to the Americans. However, one of the women had well-connected parents and got all four returned. Siham was already pregnant, so her family sent her back to North Korea. Siham appears in the film Crossing the Line, and vehemently denies the allegations that she was kidnapped or forced to go to North Korea, affirming that she is there by choice. Also according to the film, Parrish died after 20 years of kidney trouble. Siham and their children remain in North Korea.

See also
 List of American and British defectors in the Korean War: the 21 Americans and 1 Briton who refused repatriation during Operation Big Switch in 1953 (to remain in China)
 Larry Allen Abshier (1943–1983) of Urbana, Illinois, deserted on May 28, 1962, at the age of 19
 James Joseph Dresnok (1941–2016) of Richmond, Virginia, deserted on August 15, 1962, at the age of 21
 Charles Robert Jenkins (1940–2017) of Rich Square, North Carolina, deserted on January 5, 1965, at age of 24
 Roy Chung, deserted in June 1979
 Joseph T. White (1961–1985) of St. Louis, Missouri, deserted in August 1982 at the age of 20

References

1944 births
1998 deaths
American defectors
American expatriates in North Korea
People from Morganfield, Kentucky
Prisoners and detainees of North Korea
Military personnel from Kentucky
United States Army soldiers
Korean people of American descent